Alice Gentle (June 30, 1885 – February 28, 1958) was an American operatic mezzo-soprano.

Biography
She was reportedly born on June 30, 1885, in Chatsworth, Illinois, but Alice appears as a 2 year-old child in the 1880 US Census for her family, indicating she was actually born in 1878.

She began her career in 1908 as a member of the opera chorus in Oscar Hammerstein I's Manhattan Opera Company (MOC). Impressed with Gentle's talents, Hammerstein began casting her in secondary roles in MOC productions in 1909, beginning with the role of Mercédès in Georges Bizet's Carmen. She sang roles with the MOC and with Hammerstein's Philadelphia Opera Company through 1910; including Emilia in Otello, the First maid in Elektra, Flora in La traviata, Lola in Cavalleria rusticana, Maddalena in Rigoletto, Nicklausse in The Tales of Hoffmann, and Siébel in Faust among others.

In 1916 Gentle portrayed the role of Federico in Ambroise Thomas's Mignon at La Scala in Milan. She sang one season at the Metropolitan Opera, making her debut with the company in 1918 as Preziosilla in La forza del destino. Later that year she created the role of Frugola in the world premiere of Puccini's Il Tabarro. Her only other role at the Met was Fatima in Oberon in 1919. In 1923 she toured the United States as Carmen with the San Carlo Opera Company. She appeared in three films during the early 1930s: The Song of the Flame (1930), Golden Dawn (1930), and Flying Down to Rio (1933). In 1940 she made her final stage appearance at the Los Angeles Civic Light Opera as Mrs. Cripps in H.M.S. Pinafore.

She died on February 28, 1958, in Oakland, California.

References

External links

1885 births
1958 deaths
American operatic mezzo-sopranos
People from Livingston County, Illinois
20th-century American singers
20th-century American women singers
Singers from Illinois
Classical musicians from Illinois